Minuscule 853 (in the Gregory-Aland numbering), Νλ69 (von Soden), is a 15th-century Greek minuscule manuscript of the New Testament on parchment. The manuscript has no complex content.

Description 

The codex contains the text of the Gospel of Luke (6:29-12:10) on 320 parchment leaves (size ), with a catena. The text is written in one column per page, 30 lines per page.

Text 
The Greek text of the codex is a representative of the Byzantine text-type. Kurt Aland the Greek text of the codex placed in Category V.
It was not examined by the Claremont Profile Method.

History 

C. R. Gregory dated the manuscript to the 15th century. Currently the manuscript is dated by the INTF to the 15th century. 879 was probably rewritten from this manuscript.

The manuscript was added to the list of New Testament manuscripts by Gregory (853e). Gregory saw it in 1886.

Currently the manuscript is housed at the Biblioteca Casanatense (Ms. 715), in Rome.

See also 

 List of New Testament minuscules
 Biblical manuscript
 Textual criticism
 Minuscule 846 – similar manuscript

References

Further reading

External links 
 

Greek New Testament minuscules
15th-century biblical manuscripts